Shughnon District (Nohiyai Shughnon, Shughni: Xuɣ̌nůn noiya) is a district in eastern Tajikistan, in the central-western part of Gorno-Badakhshan Autonomous Region (GBAO). It is bordered by the river Panj and Afghanistan on the west, the Rushan Range and Rushon District on the north, Murghob District on the east and the Shughnon Range and Roshtqal'a District on the south. It corresponds to the valley of the river Gunt. The district seat is the village Vahdat. The population of Shughnon District is 38,000 (1 January 2020 estimate).

Administrative divisions
They are as follows:

References

Districts of Tajikistan

Gorno-Badakhshan Autonomous Region